The Archbishop of Perth is the diocesan bishop of the Anglican Diocese of Perth, Australia and ex officio metropolitan bishop of the ecclesiastical Province of Western Australia.

List of Bishops and Archbishops of Perth
References

Further reading

 

External links

 – official site

 
Lists of Anglican bishops and archbishops
Anglican bishops of Perth